Gongo Primary School is a Kenyan co-educational day primary school located in the Central Gem ward of Siaya County, Nyanza Province.

Operations
Approximately 625 pupils are enrolled. The student teacher ratio of 48:1 and this means there is 56:8 pupils per classroom in 11 classrooms.

The school is relatively competitive with most of the pupils attaining the average Kenya Certificate of Primary Education (KCPE) examination points required to join secondary education institutions.

The school recently gave rise to the Gongo Warom Secondary School to cater for the consequent imbalance between the numbers qualifying for secondary schools and the limited Form 1 places available within the surrounding secondary schools.

References 

Educational institutions with year of establishment missing
Education in Nyanza Province
Elementary and primary schools in Kenya
Public schools in Kenya
Siaya County